Lapitiguana impensa is an extinct giant (1.5 m long) iguanid from Fiji. It probably became extinct following the human colonization of Fiji 3000 years ago.

All extant Fijian iguanas are in the genus Brachylophus, together with an extinct species from Tonga. The closest living relatives of the Polynesian iguanas are found in the Americas.

See also
Brachylophus gibbonsi
Pumilia novaceki

References

External links
Fossil remains of the giant iguana Lapitiguana impensa
Lapitiguana impensa; holotype

Quaternary reptiles
Iguanidae
Reptiles of Fiji
Fossil taxa described in 2003
Reptile genera
Holocene extinctions